Icy Blu (born Laurel Yurchick, June 1, 1974) is an American recording artist who had a brief pop career in the early 1990s.

Career
In 1991, Icy Blu released a self-titled album containing the singles "Pump It (Nice an' Hard)" and "I Wanna Be Your Girl". Both singles entered the Billboard Hot 100 chart.  "Pump It (Nice an' Hard)", which samples Salt-N-Pepa's "Push It", reached the top 10 in Australia and New Zealand, and was the fortieth highest-selling single of 1991 in Australia.

Discography

Albums

Singles

References

1974 births
Living people
American women pop singers
American women rappers
20th-century American singers
Musicians from Texas
Musicians from Austin, Texas
20th-century American women singers
21st-century American singers
21st-century American women singers